Sky Ranch Airport may refer to:

 Sky Ranch Airport (Nevada) in Sandy Valley, Nevada, United States (FAA: 3L2)
 Hobart Sky Ranch Airport in Hobart, Indiana, United States (FAA: 3HO)
 Plateau Sky Ranch Airport in Edinburg, New York, United States (FAA: 1F2)
 Skyranch, an airport in the Phoenix metropolitan area (FAA: 18AZ)